Miss Germany Cooperation (MGC)  Miss 50 plus Germany.

Miss 50plus Germany 2013 - Christine Wache from Berlin. Event location: Glasparadies Bodenmais
Miss 50plus Germany 2014 - Monika Römer-Emich from Flein. Event location: Glasparadies Bodenmais
Miss 50plus Germany 2015 - Kerstin Marie Huth-Rauscher from Frankfurt. Event location: Kurhaus Bad Neuenahr
Miss 50plus Germany 2016 - Martina Selke from Friedrichsdorf. Event location: Kurhaus Bad Neuenahr
Miss 50plus Germany 2017 - Christine Lösch-Schleier from Königslutter. Event location: Mercure MOA Hotel Berlin
Miss 50plus Germany 2018 - Manuela Thoma-Adofo from Kirchheim. Event location: Schloss Oldenburg
Miss 50plus Germany 2019 - Evelyn Reißmann from Plauen. Event location: Wandelhalle Bad Zwischenahn

External links
Official website

Beauty pageants in Germany
Annual events in Germany